Stilpnomelane is a phyllosilicate mineral. It has the chemical formula .

Stilpnomelane occurs associated with banded iron formations. It is a metamorphic mineral associated with the blueschist and greenschist facies.

It was first described in 1827 for an occurrence in Moravia in the Czech Republic.

References

Phyllosilicates
Triclinic minerals
Minerals in space group 2